Delias muliensis is a butterfly in the family Pieridae. It was described by Sadaharu Morinaka, Henricus Jacobus Gerardus van Mastrigt and Atuhiro Sibatani in 1991. It is found in the Central Mountains of Irian Jaya.

References

External links
Delias at Markku Savela's Lepidoptera and Some Other Life Forms

muliensis
Butterflies described in 1991